Vallica is a commune in the Haute-Corse department of France on the island of Corsica.

Geography
It is situated in the Giussani Valley with Olmi Cappella being its closest neighbor village.

Population

Events
Once a year, Vallica is one of the few villages in the Giussani that host the Aria theater festival. The festival was created by French actor Robin Renucci in 1998.

See also
Communes of the Haute-Corse department

References

External links
 Official web site

Communes of Haute-Corse